Laylo Khalimova (born 16 November 1997) is a Tajik football and futsal player who plays as a forward for Tajik club Khatlon in the Tajik women's league and the Tajikistan women's national football team.

Khalimova is Tajikistan women's league all-time top scorer.

Club career

Khatlon
Khalimova played the inaugural Tajik women's football league with Khalton FC, where she scored 16 goals in 10 match appearances. Although her team finished as runners-up, Laylo was named the top soccer of the 2018 edition. in the 2019's season Khalimova helped her team earn gold medals for the first time beating Zeboniso. in which she finished as the top scorer. in 2020 Laylo received its three in row golden boot after scoring 78 goals in 18 matches.
2021 saw Khalton's striker Khalimova voted the Tajik women's player of the year. after her team won the league for the second time in its History, Khalimova scored 67 goals in 18 matches. and yet earning her fourth in-row golden boot. Khalimova widen the gap between her and her fellow mates after winning her fifth golden boot in 2022 after she scored 68 goals in that season.

International goals

Honours

Tajikistan
2018 CAFA Women's Championship:

  Third place: 2018

FC Khalton
Tajikistan women's Higher League:
  Champions: 2021, 2019
  Runners-up: 2018, 2020, 2022

Individual
FFT Tajik Women's Footballer of the Year: 2021
Tajikistan women's Higher League Top Scorer: 2018, 2020, 2021, 2022

References

1997 births
Living people
Tajikistani women's footballers
Women's association football forwards
Tajikistan women's international footballers